Glan-y-môr is a small village in the  community of Tirymynach, Ceredigion, Wales, which is 76.4 miles (123 km) from Cardiff and 180 miles (289.7 km) from London. Glan-y-môr is represented in the Senedd by Elin Jones (Plaid Cymru) and the Member of Parliament is Ben Lake (Plaid Cymru).

References

See also
List of localities in Wales by population

Villages in Ceredigion